The Liga Nacional de Handebol Feminino 2018 (2018 Women's National Handball League) was the 22nd season of the top tier Brazilian handball national competitions for clubs, it is organized by the Brazilian Handball Confederation. For the 3rd time UnC Concórdia was crowned champion winning the final against UNIP São Bernardo.

Teams qualified for the play-offs
South Southeast Conference
 UnC Concórdia
 EC Pinheiros
 UNIP São Bernardo
 Abluhand Blumenau
Northeastern Conference
 Português AESO
 Sport Recife
Northern Conference
 Rádio Farol
Central west Conference
 Força Atlética

Play-offs

Final

References

External links
CBHb official web site

Bra